The 2013 CAF Champions League (also known as the 2013 Orange CAF Champions League for sponsorship reasons) was the 49th edition of Africa's premier club football tournament organized by the Confederation of African Football (CAF), and the 17th edition under the current CAF Champions League format. The winner qualified for the 2013 FIFA Club World Cup, and earned the right to play in the 2014 CAF Super Cup.

In the final, defending champions Al-Ahly of Egypt defeated Orlando Pirates of South Africa, and were crowned African club champions for a record eighth time.

Association team allocation
All 56 CAF member associations may enter the CAF Champions League, with the 12 highest ranked associations according to their CAF 5-Year Ranking eligible to enter two teams in the competition. The title holders could also enter if they had not already qualified for the CAF Champions League. As a result, theoretically a maximum of 69 teams could enter the tournament – although this level has never been reached.

For the 2013 CAF Champions League, the CAF used the 2007–2011 CAF 5-Year Ranking, which calculated points for each association based on their clubs’ performance over those 5 years in the CAF Champions League and CAF Confederation Cup. The criteria for points were the following:

The points were multiplied by a coefficient according to the year as follows:
2011 – 5
2010 – 4
2009 – 3
2008 – 2
2007 – 1

Teams
The following teams entered the competition. Teams in bold received a bye to the first round. The other teams entered the preliminary round.

Associations are shown according to their 2007–2011 CAF 5-Year Ranking – those with a ranking score have their rank and score indicated.

Notes

The following associations did not enter a team: Cape Verde, Djibouti, Eritrea, Guinea-Bissau, Malawi, Mauritania, Mauritius, Namibia, Réunion, Somalia, South Sudan.

Schedule
The schedule of the competition was as follows (all draws held at CAF headquarters in Cairo, Egypt).

Qualifying rounds

The draw for the preliminary, first and second qualifying rounds was held on 9 December 2012, and the fixtures were announced by the CAF on 10 December 2012.

Qualification ties were played on a home-and-away two-legged basis. If the sides were level on aggregate after the second leg, the away goals rule was applied, and if still level, the tie proceeded directly to a penalty shoot-out (no extra time was played).

Preliminary round

|}

Notes

First round

|}

Second round

|}

The losers of the second round entered the 2013 CAF Confederation Cup play-off round.

Group stage

The draw for the group stage was held on 14 May 2013. The eight teams were drawn into two groups of four. Each group was played on a home-and-away round-robin basis. The winners and runners-up of each group advanced to the semi-finals.

Tiebreakers
The teams are ranked according to points (3 points for a win, 1 point for a tie, 0 points for a loss). If tied on points, tiebreakers are applied in the following order:
Number of points obtained in games between the teams concerned
Goal difference in games between the teams concerned
Away goals scored in games between the teams concerned
Goal difference in all games
Goals scored in all games

Group A

Group B

Knock-out stage

Knock-out ties were played on a home-and-away two-legged basis. If the sides were level on aggregate after the second leg, the away goals rule was applied, and if still level, the tie proceeded directly to a penalty shoot-out (no extra time was played).

Bracket

Semi-finals
In the semi-finals, the group A winners played the group B runners-up, and the group B winners played the group A runners-up, with the group winners hosting the second leg.

|}

Final

In the final, the order of legs was decided by a draw.

Top scorers

See also
2013 CAF Confederation Cup
2013 FIFA Club World Cup
2014 CAF Super Cup

References

External links

 
2013
1